This is a list of mountains and summits in Fairfield County, Connecticut.

List

References